Ole Torvalds (4 August 1916 – 8 February 1995) was a Finnish-Swedish journalist and poet. He was the father of journalist-politician Nils Torvalds and grandfather of software engineer Linus Torvalds famous for the Linux kernel.

His full name was Ole Torvald Elis Saxberg, but he was also named Karanko after his step father, Toivo Karanko.  His family belongs to the Swedish-speaking minority. In 1935 when he had moved to Helsinki for studies he changed his name to Torvalds. In 1944 he was awarded a literature prize from Svenska Dagbladet (shared with Harry Martinson, Lars Ahlin and Elly Jannes). In 1978 he received an honorary doctorate from Åbo Akademi.

His career as journalist was started as editor of Västra Nyland in Ekenäs where he stayed until after World War II.

He was married to Märta von Wendt and had three children with her. After a divorce he became editor of Österbottningen in Karleby. Then he remarried with Meta Torvalds, fathered two more children and later became editor of Åbo Underrättelser, of which he was the chief editor from 1958 to 1967.

Works 
 "Vi sjunger inte för dem" (We don't sing for them), 1939
 "Ointagligt land", poems (Indomitable country), 1942
 "Hemligt medansvar" (Secret partial responsibility), poems, 1944
 "Svår glädje" (Difficult happiness), short stories, 1946
 "Strängar av aska" (Strings of ash), poems, 1954
 "Mellan is och eld" (Between ice and fire), poems, 1957
 "Vid källorna" (By the springs), 1961
 "Speglingar i en å" (Reflections in a river), 1972
 "Livstecken" (Signs of life), poems, 1986
 "Vågmärken" (Wave marks; literally Wave-formed ripple marks), poems about the archipelago 1937–1987, 1988

In addition, Ole Torvalds participated in compiling several cultural historical books and other works. He is one of the authors biographied by Project Runeberg.

Translations 
 Hangö fästning, Reino Aaltonen
 Ett sekel till havs, Effoas hundra första år 1883–1983, Paavo Haavikko
 Nio mans stövlar, Pentti Haanpää 
 Efter applåderna, Kosti Vehanen
 Sinuhe, egyptiern (The Egyptian), Mika Waltari

References 

1916 births
1995 deaths
People from Raseborg
People from Uusimaa Province (Grand Duchy of Finland)
Swedish-speaking Finns
Writers from Uusimaa
Finnish poets in Swedish
20th-century poets
Ole
20th-century Finnish journalists